is a Japanese voice actor, narrator, and radio personality from Aichi Prefecture, Japan.

His well-known roles include heroes such as Cloud Strife in Compilation of Final Fantasy VII, Suzaku Kururugi in Code Geass and X in Mega Man X, as well as villains such as Maximilien Robespierre in Le Chevalier D'Eon, Hiltz in Zoids: Guardian Force, Sasori in Naruto Shippūden, and Rohan Kishibe in JoJo's Bizarre Adventure: Diamond is Unbreakable. He voiced the main character Miyuki Kazuya in Ace of Diamond. He is the official Japanese dub voice for Robert Pattinson since Twilight. His range is tenor. He is currently affiliated with INTENTION.

Early life
Sakurai is the eldest of three siblings born to a family that owned a rice shop. When he was a child, he became interested in voice acting after watching a television interview with a voice actor. He graduated from Okazaki Johsei High School. After graduating from Yoyogi Animation Academy in Nagoya and 81 Acting Institute, he made his official anime debut in 1996 with the TV animation series Bakusō Kyōdai Let's & Go!!. Sakurai stated that he would have taken over his family's rice shop if he did not pursue voice acting.

Career
After moving on from the training school, he became a member of 81 Produce under the influence of his admiration for Toshihiko Seki. Even before his official debut, he had already received work in radio dramas and other projects during his time at the training school, but for a while after his debut, there was a period of time when he was unable to find work even after auditioning. In 1999, when he was 25 years old and wondering if he should quit voice acting, he got regular roles in two TV anime in a row, Digimon Adventure and Sensual Phrase, and in the same year, he sang his first character song in his first starring movie, Gate Keepers.

On April 22, 2011, Sakurai won the "Male Character Voice Award" at Famitsu Awards 2010. In 2012, he won the "Overseas Fan's Award" at the 6th Seiyu Awards.

In 2013, after a year of discussions with the record company, Sakurai announced on his radio show that he would be singing the character song for Shirokuma Cafe. In April, he announced on the radio show "Cherry Bell Co., Ltd" that he would be leaving 81 Produce, where he had worked since his debut, and going freelance. On July 20, 2014, it was announced on the official website that he became a member of INTENTION, founded by his friend Kenichi Suzumura.

On October 25, 2016, Sakurai stepped on the red carpet at the 27th Tokyo International Film Festival as John Paul in Genocidal Organ with Yuichi Nakamura as Clavis Shepherd. On October 25, 2018, he attended the 31st Tokyo International Film Festival as Metofies in Godzilla: The Planet Eater with Mamoru Miyano as Haruo.

Sakurai lists people like Ryūsei Nakao, Chō, Ryōtarō Okiayu, Tomokazu Seki, and Minami Takayama as his favorite and respected voice actors, and he had a close relationship with Keiji Fujiwara in his private life. He is good at illustration and once wanted to be an illustrator. In addition to the eyecatching illustrations in Canvas 2: Niji Iro no Sketch, he was also a member of the key drawing staff for the final episode of Code Geass: Lelouch of the Rebellion R2, and was credited as a logotype designer for the second season of Active Raid.

Personal life

Sakurai has been married to a former voice actress for nearly 20 years, which was not disclosed to the public until September 2022 after he acknowledged a report published by Shukan Bunshun. On October 26, 2022, Shukan Bunshun reported that Sakurai had been having an extramarital affair with a writer from his radio show, P.S. Genki Desu: Takahiro, which began in October 2013 and had been terminated suddenly on October 24, 2022, without any explanation of reasons given. The two had been in a relationship for 10 years, with them intending to marry; however, the writer had allegedly not been aware of Sakurai's marital status until September 2022. On November 3, 2022, the chief of Second Shot, the company behind Sakurai's radio show, apologized to the listeners, who were upset from Sakurai and the writer dating and having to listen to them on the radio show. In the same announcement, they cancelled preorders for a product originally set to be released in November 2022.

Filmography

Television animation

OVA/ONA/Films

Unknown date
.hack//G.U. Trilogy as Haseo
Divine Love as Hyde
Vie Durant as Di

Drama CDs

 The Apothecary Diaries (2020) as Jinshi
1K Apartment no Koi
7th Dragon 2020 & 2020-II Drama CD as Takehaya
Adekan as Yoshiwara Anri
Aka no Shinmon as Kei Kazuragawa
Akaya Akashiya Ayakashino as Akiyoshi Tochika
Are you Alice? as Alice
Ai wo Utau yori Ore ni Oborero! (Blaue Rosen) as Rui Kiryuuin
Baito wa Maid!? as Minori Ogata
Baito wa Maid!? 2 – Shuubun!? Senden!? as Minori Ogata
BALETT STAR as Horinouchi Keisuke
Be My Princess as Glenn J. Cashiragi
Buddy Complex BC EXTRA STORIES Vol.6 as Bizon Gerafil
Code Geass - Lelouch of the Rebellion as Suzaku Kururugi
Cyborg 009 Drama CD: Love Stories as Joe Shimamura
Diabolik Lovers as Ruki Mukami
Dogs: Bullets & Carnage as Haine Rammsteiner
Dolls as Toudou Usaki
Ecstasy wa Eien ni ~Utsukushiki Rougoku~ (Takaomi)
Executive Boy (Hiromi Kuresaka)
Fate/Prototype Special Drama CD(Christmas Murder Case) as Saber/Arthur Pendragon
Fate/Prototype: Sougin no Fragments as Saber/Arthur Pendragon
Fushigi Yugi Genbu Kaiden as Rimudo/Uruki (male form)
Gaki no Ryoubun series 3: Saikyou Hiiruzu (Chiaki Hidaka)
Gaki no Ryoubun series 5: Akuun no Jouken (Chiaki Hidaka)
Gaki no Ryoubun series 7: Monster Panic (Chiaki Hidaka)
Gouka Kyakusen de Koi wa Hajimaru series as Minato Kurahara
Gray Zone as Yuzuru Kousaka
Hatenkō Yūgi as Alzeid
Junjou Boy Series 2: Junjou Heart Kaihouku as Kouji Nakazawa
Junjo Romantica as Misaki Takahashi
Kamui as Atsuma Hasumi
Kairyuu Gakuen Twins series 1: Scandalous Twins (Kazuma Kitashiro)
Kairyuu Gakuen Twins series 2: Dangerous Twins (Kazuma Kitashiro)
Kedamono as Rentarou Sakakibara
Kirepapa as Shunsuke Sakaki
Kiss to do-jin! ~Ōjisama wa Karisuma Ōte!?~ as Tooru Hikawa
Kyo Kara Maoh! as Yuri Shibuya
L DK as Kugayama Shuusei
Love Mode as Rin Takimura
Lovely Complex as Atsushi Otani
Mahou Gakuen Series 1: Binetsu Club (Ryuui)
Mahou Gakuen Series 2: Himitsu Garden (Ryuui)
Mahou Gakuen Series 3: Mugen Palace (Ryuui)
Mahou Gakuen Series 4: Yuuwaku Lesson (Ryuui)
Mahou Gakuen Series side story: Daiundoukai Zenyasai (Ryuui)
Miscast Series Volumes 4 onwards as Andray Hayami
Mix★Mix★Chocolate as Hara
Mizuki-sensei Kiki Ippatsu as Mizuki Sakanaga
Munasawagi series as Yuuya Yamashino
Naito wa Oatsuinoga Osuki series 1 (Kazuma Kitashiro)
Naito wa Oatsuinoga Osuki series 2: Naito wa Hageshiinoga Osuki (Kazuma Kitashiro)
News Center no Koibito as Narumi Kobayashi
Ookami Shoujo to Kuro Ouji as Sata Kyouya
Ourin Gakuen series 3: Sekushi Boizu de Sasayaide as Daisuke Nogami
Rijichou-sama no Okiniiri as Ryou Utsunomiya
Sacrificial Princess and the King of Beasts, Prime Minister Anubis
Saint Seiya Ougon 12 Kyu Hen as Dragon Shiryu
S.L.H Stray Love Hearts! as Kitou Ninomiya
Shitsuji-sama no Okiniiri as Kanzawa Hakuou
Shounen Yonkei
Sket Dance as Sasuke Tsubaki
Slavers Series as Shuuichi Kurahashi
Sugar Apple Fairytale as Shall Fen Shall
Sono Yubi Dake ga Shitteru as Yuichi Kazuki
Suki na Mono wa Suki Dakara Shouganai as Fuuta Kitamura (starting from White Flower)
Sukitte Ii Nayo as Yamato Kurosawa
Switch as Hal Kurabayashi
Teiden Shoujou to Hanemushi no Orchestra as Haibane
Tokyo Yabanjin (Barbarian in Tokyo) as Ubuki Kano
Tsumitsukuri na Kimi as Sin (Maya Sakaki)
Tsuyogari as Shiba and Keisuke
Uragiri wa Boku no Namae wo Shitteiru (Betrayal Knows My Name) as Luka Crosszeria
V.B.Rose as 'ukari Arisaka
Wagamama Prisoner (Azusa Kashiwagi)
Wagamama Prisoner/My Master is My Classmate section (Chihiro Takarao)
Wakakusa Monogatari ~Kami Hikouki ni Notte~ (Laurence "Laurie")
Watashi ga Motete Dōsunda as Asuma Mutsumi
Watashi ni xx Shinasai! as Shigure Kitami
Yabai Kimochi (Desire) as Toru Maiki
Yandere Heaven as Saionji Ran
Yasashikute Toge ga Aru as Chihiro Houshou
Yellow as Taki
Yurigaoka Gakuen series 1: Heart mo Ace mo Boku no Mono as Kuu Houjou
Yurigaoka Gakuen series 2: Kimidake no Prince ni Naritai  as Kuu Houjou
Zombie-Loan as Shito Tachibana
Hatoful Boyfriend as Anghel Higure

Live-action film
Mr. Osomatsu (2022) – Osomatsu (voice)

Television drama
Koe Koi (2016) – Matsubara (voice)

Tokusatsu

Video games

.hack//G.U. as Haseo
Akane-sasu Sekai de Kimi to Utau as Fujiwara no Teika
Another Century's Episode: R as Suzaku Kururugi
Another Century's Episode Portable as Suzaku Kururugi
Ape Escape series as Ukki Blue
Arena of Valor as Zanis
Bad Apple Wars as Aruma
Black Wolves Saga: Bloody Nightmare as Mejojo von Garibaldi
Black Wolves Saga: Last Hope as Mejojo von Garibaldi
Code Geass: Lost Colors as Suzaku Kururugi
Crisis Core -Final Fantasy VII-, Dirge of Cerberus -Final Fantasy VII-, Dissidia: Final Fantasy, the Kingdom Hearts series as Cloud Strife
Danganronpa: Trigger Happy Havoc as Leon Kuwata
Diabolik Lovers, More Blood as Ruki Mukami
Dragalia Lost as Orion
Dragon Quest XI: Echoes of an Elusive Age as Jasper
Fatal Frame IV: Mask of the Lunar Eclipse as You Haibara
Fate Holy Grail Hot Springs War as Saber/Arthur Pendragon 〔Prototype〕
Fate/stay night Réalta Nua: Take Off! Super Dimensional Trouble Hanafuda Epic Battle as Saber/Arthur Pendragon
Fate/Grand Order as Merlin and Arthur Pendragon 〔Prototype〕
Fire Emblem Echoes: Shadows of Valentia as Lukas
Fire Emblem Heroes as Eliwood, Lukas, Julius
Final Fantasy Type-0 as Kurasame
Final Fantasy Type-0 HD as Kurasame
Full House Kiss as Asaki Hanekura
Fushigi Yūgi Genbu Kaiden Gaiden: Kagami no Miko as Rimudo/Uruki
Galaxy Angel as Red-Eye
Granblue Fantasy as Lucifer, Lucio, Lucilius (GB) / Rushifa (ルシファ) (JP), Shao, Suzaku Kururugi, Black Beast
Gran Saga as Orta
Guilty Crown: Lost Xmas as Scrooge
Harukanaru Toki no Naka de Maihitoyo (PS2) as Oo no Suefumi
GioGio's Bizarre Adventure as Bruno Bucciarati
JoJo's Bizarre Adventure: Diamond Records as Rohan Kishibe
Kyo Kara Maoh! Oresama Quest (PC) as Yuuri Shibuya
Kyo Kara Maoh! Hajimari no Tabi (PS2) as Yuuri Shibuya
Konjiki no Gash Bell series as Kiyomaro Takamine
Lost Dimension as The End
Lovely Complex as Otani Atsushi
Memories Off 5 The Unfinished Film as Yusuke Hina
Mermaid Prism
Mix★Mix★Chocolate as Hara
Mobile Suit Gundam Side Story: Missing Link as Vincent Gleissner
Nana as Ren Honjo
Naruto video games as Sasori
Nioh as Ishida Mitsunari
Nine Hours, Nine Persons, Nine Doors as Snake/Light
Nise no Chigiri as Yamamoto Kansuke
Nora to Toki no Kōbō: Kiri no Mori no Majo as Kyto Berman
Onmyōji as the Medicine Seller
Orange Honey as Shinya Shiraishi
Phantasy Star Online 2 as Luther, Saga
Pokémon Masters EX as Dande (Leon)
Princess Maker 4 as Prince Sharul/Charle
Sengoku Basara 4 Sumeragi as Sen no Rikyū
Shenmue as Lan Di "Longsun Zhao"
Shenmue II as Lan Di "Longsun Zhao"
Shin Megami Tensei: Devil Survivor 2 as Alcor (Anguished One)
Shin Megami Tensei: Strange Journey Redux as Jimenez
Shinobi, Koi Utsutsu as Kirigakure Kuroudo
Skylanders: Giants as Fright Rider (Japanese dub)
Star Project Online as Yano Kazuteru
Super Robot Wars GC as Gou Ichimonji
Super Robot Wars Z2 as Suzaku Kururu
Tagatame no Alchemist (The Alchemist Code) as Sol
Tales of Legendia as Walter Delqes
Tales of Graces as Asbel Lhant
Tales of the Heroes: Twin Brave as Asbel Lhant
Tales of the World: Radiant Mythology 3 as Asbel Lhant
Tengai Makyou III: Namida as Namida
The Bouncer as Sion Barzahd
Tokyo Babel as Adam
Trails of Cold Steel/Sen no Kiseki series as Crow Armbrust
Trauma Team as CR-S01
Ultraman Fusion Fight! as Orb Ring
Utawarerumono: Mask of Deception as Ougi
Utawarerumono: Mask of Truth as Ougi
Valkyrie of the Battlefield: Gallian Chronicles (PS3) as Faldio Landzaat
Virtua Fighter series as Lei-Fei
Wand of Fortune as Julius Fortner
WarTech: Senko no Ronde as Mika Mikli
White Knight Chronicles as Shapur
World of Final Fantasy as Cloud Strife
Zegapain NOT as Toga Dupe
Zegapain XOR as Toga Vital

Dubbing roles

Live-action

Animation

References

External links

 
Takahiro Sakurai at GamePlaza-Haruka Voice Acting Database 
Takahiro Sakurai at Hitoshi Doi's Seiyuu Database
Takahiro Sakurai at the Seiyuu database

1974 births
Living people
Japanese male video game actors
Japanese male voice actors
Japanese radio personalities
Male voice actors from Aichi Prefecture
People from Okazaki, Aichi
20th-century Japanese male actors
21st-century Japanese male actors
81 Produce voice actors